The Spain women's national under-19 football team represents Spain in international football in under-19 categories and is controlled by the Royal Spanish Football Federation.

Competitive record

UEFA Women's U19 Championship record

Copa del Atlántico
The Copa del Atlántico Femenina was a European invitational tournament for national under-19 teams in women's association football between 2007 and 2008.

Players

Current squad
The following players were called up for the 2022 UEFA Women's Under-19 Championship qualification from 4 to 13 April 2022.
Caps and goals as of 12 April 2022.

Recent call-ups

Previous rosters
2004 FIFA U-19 Women's World Championship squad

Statistics

Top Appearances

Those marked in bold went on to earn full international caps 
Those marked in italic went on to earn full international caps with other national football team

Top Goalscorers

Those marked in bold went on to earn full international caps 
Those marked in italic went on to earn full international caps with other national football team

Hat-tricks

4 Player scored 4 goals5 Player scored 5 goals 6 Player scored 6 goals

See also
Spain women's national football team
Spain women's national under-20 football team
Spain women's national under-17 football team

References

External links
 Spain women's national under-19 football team at UEFA.com

Women's national under-19 association football teams
European women's national under-19 association football teams
Football